Elda Pucci (21 February 1928 – 14 October 2005) was an Italian politician and professor.

Biography
Elda Pucci was born in Trapani, Italy in 1928 and died in Palermo, Italy in 2005 at the age of 77. She is daughter of Stefano Pucci. She graduated from the University of Palermo.

She was member of the Christian Democracy. She has served as Mayor of Palermo from 1983 to 1984.

She was Member of the European Parliament from 1992 to 1994. She participated in the tennis competitions of the VII National Women's Championship of the Gioventù Italiana del Littorio in 1942. She was national president of the Soroptimist Club of Italy from 1987 to 1989.

She was mayor of the Sicilian capital from 1983 to 1984, the first woman in a large Italian city.

She was several times a municipal councilor of the Christian Democracy in Palermo.

See also
 List of mayors of Palermo

References

External links
 Elda Pucci on radioradicale.it
 Elda Pucci on europarl.europa.eu

1928 births
2005 deaths
People from Trapani
Italian Republican Party politicians
21st-century Italian women politicians
20th-century Italian women politicians
Mayors of Palermo
University of Palermo alumni